The Djiboutian Women's Championship is the top flight of women's association football in Djibouti. The competition is run by the Djiboutian Football Federation.

History
The first Djiboutian women's championship was contested in 1999-00 season, it was won by Bis Mer Rouge Club.

Champions
The list of champions and runners-up:

Most successful clubs 

Rq:

References

External links 
 Division 1 (Féminin) - FDF official website

 
Women's association football leagues in Africa
Football competitions in Djibouti
Women
Sports leagues established in 1999